Alice Algisi (born 10 March 1993) is an Italian former professional racing cyclist.

See also
 2014 Astana BePink Women's Team season

References

External links
 

1993 births
Living people
Italian female cyclists
Cyclists from Bergamo
21st-century Italian women